Eric Ellington (May 15, 1889 – November 24, 1913) was a United States Naval and later Army officer. He was one of the first U. S. servicemen to be killed in an airplane crash. A United States Naval Academy graduate, his nickname at the Academy was "Polly".

Early life
Ellington was born in North Carolina in 1889 to Sheriff Jesse T. Ellington and his second wife Sallie Williamson. He had 6 half siblings from his father's first marriage. His mother died in 1901 when Eric was 12 and he went to live with an older half-brother John Ellington and finished grade school. He graduated from high school in 1905 at 16.

U.S. Navy
Ellington started at the Naval Academy at sixteen. He graduated in 1909 third in his class and received a Bachelor's Degree. He spent the next two years in mandated Naval being commissioned an Ensign in June 1911. He resigned his commission in November 1911 to accept a commission the U. S. Army.

U. S. Army
After being commissioned a 2nd Lieutenant in the Army, Ellington was stationed at Fort Sam Houston. This lasted until December 1912 when he moved to College Park, Maryland. At College Park Ellington was placed in the Aeronautical Division, U. S. Signal Corps. Ellington transferred to San Diego where he qualified as an Army pilot in August 1913 and later an instructor.

Death
Ellington and 2nd Lt. Hugh M. Kelly were killed at San Diego November 24, 1913 during a training flight for Kelly. Ellington was buried in Clayton, North Carolina, in the family plot.

Legacy
Ellington Field Joint Reserve Base is named in honor of Lt. Eric Ellington.

References

External links
EarlyAviators.com

1889 births
1913 deaths
Accidental deaths in California
Aviators killed in aviation accidents or incidents in the United States
Victims of aviation accidents or incidents in 1913